Gerald William Joseph Brown (July 7, 1917 – August 18, 1998) was a Canadian ice hockey player who played 23 games in the National Hockey League with the Detroit Red Wings be1942 and 1945. The rest of his career, which lasted from 1935 to 1952, was spent in the minor leagues. He was born in Edmonton, Alberta.

Career statistics

Regular season and playoffs

External links
 

1917 births
1998 deaths
Buffalo Bisons (AHL) players
Canadian expatriate ice hockey players in the United States
Canadian ice hockey left wingers
Cornwall Flyers players
Detroit Red Wings players
Earls Court Rangers players
Hershey Bears players
Indianapolis Capitals players
Ice hockey people from Edmonton